Kyle Egan Richards Umansky (born January 11, 1969) is an American actress, socialite, and television personality. Since 2010, she has appeared as a main cast member on The Real Housewives of Beverly Hills, and as of 2022, is the last remaining original cast member on the show. 

She began her career as a child actress, appearing in a recurring role on Little House on the Prairie, and in several adventure and horror films, including Tobe Hooper's Eaten Alive (1976), The Car (1977), and Walt Disney’s The Watcher in the Woods (1980), as well as portraying Lindsey Wallace in John Carpenter's Halloween (1978) and later Halloween Kills (2021) and its sequel, Halloween Ends (2022). In 2017, she was a contestant on The New Celebrity Apprentice (also known as The Celebrity Apprentice 8), playing for the charity Children's Hospital Los Angeles.

Early life
Richards was born on January 11, 1969, in the Hollywood neighborhood of Los Angeles, California. She is the daughter of Kathleen Mary Richards (née Dugan; 1938–2002) and Kenneth Edwin Richards (1917–1998). She was named for Kyle Rote, a football player who played for the New York Giants. The couple separated in 1972 and Kathleen later remarried twice more. Richards' siblings are Kathy Hilton (born 1959), her older half-sister from her mother's first marriage to Lawrence Avanzino, and Kim Richards (born 1964), as well as three paternal half-siblings from her father's first marriage, all of whom were adults by the time Richards was born. Nicky and Paris Hilton are her nieces. In 1987, she graduated from Central Union High School in El Centro, California.

Career

Film and television
Richards began her acting career in 1974, portraying Julia in the television series Police Woman. She appeared in 18 episodes of NBC's Western historical drama television series Little House on the Prairie as Alicia Sanderson Edwards. Her sister, Kim, was also an actress, who appeared in one episode of Little House on the Prairie, the season before Kyle joined the cast. The two sisters played on-screen sisters in the 1977 the thriller film The Car. Through the 1970s, Richards appeared on several television series, such as Flying High, Vega$, Fantasy Island, Time Express and Carter Country. Richards portrayed Lindsey Wallace in the slasher film Halloween (1978) alongside Jamie Lee Curtis. Halloween became a widely influential film within the horror genre; it was largely responsible for the popularization of slasher films in the 1980s and helped develop the slasher genre.

In 1980, she appeared in the supernatural horror film The Watcher in the Woods. Subsequent roles included Nurse Dori Kerns in 21 episodes of NBC's medical drama series ER (1998–2006) and Lisa, a supporting character in the comedy film National Lampoon's Pledge This! (2006). She played Tricia in Lifetime's television film Deadly Sibling Rivalry (2011) and Housewife Heather in the comedy film The Hungover Games (2014). She had guest roles in several television shows, including C.S.I., 7th Heaven, City Guys, Beverly Hills, 90210, Love Boat: The Next Wave, and CHiPs.

Since 2010, she has appeared as a main cast member on Bravo's reality television show The Real Housewives of Beverly Hills. In 2012, she graced the magazine cover of The Hollywood Reporter along with other Real Housewives franchise's cast members Vicki Gunvalson, Ramona Singer, Caroline Manzo and NeNe Leakes. She was nominated for "Reality Star of 2019" award at the 2019 People's Choice Awards. In 2013, she portrayed modeling agent Casey McGraw in three episodes of NBC's soap opera Days of Our Lives. In 2017, Richards appeared as a contestant on The New Celebrity Apprentice and earned $25,000 for her charity of choice, Children's Hospital Los Angeles. She was the 5th contestant fired, finishing in 12th place.

Richards co-executive produced Paramount Network's comedy television series American Woman (2018), which was inspired by her childhood in the 1970s. On August 30, 2019, it was confirmed that Richards would reprise the role of Lindsey Wallace, the role she originated in the original 1978 film, in Halloween Kills. Following a year delay due to the COVID-19 pandemic, Halloween Kills had its world premiere at the 78th Venice International Film Festival on September 8, 2021, and was theatrically released in the United States on October 15, 2021, by Universal Pictures. The film made $4.85 million from Thursday night previews, the biggest for both an R-rated title and a horror film amid the pandemic. The film has grossed a total of $131 million at the worldwide box office and stands as one of the year’s highest grossing horror movies behind A Quiet Place Part II. Her performance in the film attracted positive reactions from fans.

Richards starred in The Real Housewives Ultimate Girls Trip, a spin-off featuring various women from The Real Housewives franchise, that premiered on November 16, 2021 on streaming service Peacock. In August 2021, Richards started filming Christmas film The Real Housewives of the North Pole in Utah, set to air on Peacock in December. The film follows two "Christmas Queens" Trish, played by Richards and Diana, portrayed by Betsy Brandt, who take part in decorating contest every year, but the two get into an argument just days before Christmas. On October 25, 2021, Entertainment Weekly released first photos of the film.

On December 7, 2021, People magazine announced that Richards is returning for the upcoming sequel Halloween Ends to reprise her role as Lindsey Wallace. In 2022, she is nominated for the second time in the category "The Reality TV Star of 2022" at the People’s Choice Awards.

Fashion and other ventures
On February 25, 2014, Richards launched a clothing line for shopping network HSN. The eight-piece collection was inspired by her personal style and was priced between $69.90 and $199.90. Richards and Shahida Clayton debuted their clothing collection titled Kyle x Shahida at New York Fashion Week on September 8, 2019. Richards is the owner of Kyle by Alene Too, a chain of boutiques in The Hamptons and New York City. Her boutique in Beverly Hills opened in 2012 and closed in 2018 with plans to re-open the store in a new location. In November 2021, Richards opened a luxury resort and loungewear boutique Kyle x Shahida in Palm Desert.

Her memoir titled Life Is Not a Reality Show: Keeping It Real with the Housewife Who Does It All was published by HarperOne on December 27, 2011. Richards shares tips on relationships, family and beauty in the book.

Philanthropy

With her husband, Richards is listed on the "First Families" of the Children's Hospital Los Angeles which means they have donated US$100,000 or more to the hospital. She also held fundraisers for the CHLA in 2013 and 2019, which were featured on the Real Housewives.

Personal life
In the 1980s she dated actor C. Thomas Howell. In 1988, at the age of 19, Richards married Guraish Aldjufrie from Indonesia while she was pregnant with their daughter Farrah Brittany (born October 31, 1988), but they separated in 1990 and divorced two years later.

Richards met her second husband, Mauricio Umansky, a Los Angeles real estate agent, in 1994. Umansky is of Russian and Greek Jewish descent. He is the son of Estella Sneider. He was born and raised in Mexico. The couple wed on January 20, 1996, when Kyle was 4 months pregnant. Their daughter Alexia Simone was born on June 18, 1996. The couple have two more daughters, Sophia Kylie (born on January 18, 2000) and Portia (born on March 1, 2008). Richards, who is of English, Irish and Welsh descent, converted to Modern Orthodox Judaism when she married Umansky. She attends events at the Kabbalah Centre in Los Angeles.

She resides in Encino, Los Angeles with her husband and children.

In December 2020, it was reported that Richards tested positive for COVID-19, along with her co-star Dorit Kemsley and sister Kathy Hilton. Production for season 11 of The Real Housewives of Beverly Hills was temporarily suspended.

Filmography

Film and television

As herself

Music videos

As producer

Awards and nominations

Bibliography

References

External links

 
 Kyle Richards Facebook page

1969 births
Living people
People from Bel Air, Los Angeles
Actresses from Hollywood, Los Angeles
American child actresses
American film actresses
American television actresses
American socialites
Conrad Hilton family
Converts to Orthodox Judaism
Jewish American actresses
American Orthodox Jews
The Real Housewives cast members
American memoirists
American women memoirists
Philanthropists from California
Jewish American philanthropists
20th-century American actresses
21st-century American actresses
Richards family
The Apprentice (franchise) contestants
American people of Irish descent
American people of Welsh descent
American people of English descent